William George Foster,  (12 December 1880 – 13 September 1942) was a British Home Guard officer who was posthumously awarded the George Cross for the heroism he displayed on 13 September 1942 when his prompt actions saved his comrades after a grenade accident during training in Ashley Hill, Clarendon Park near Salisbury in Wiltshire. In protecting his comrades from death or severe injury his own life was lost.

He was born at sea on 12 December 1880 and served in the Boer War with the Royal Fusiliers and the Imperial Light Horse, returning to Britain after being seriously wounded. He was medically discharged in 1902, but rejoined the army during the First World War. He served with the 4th Battalion, Royal Fusiliers and fought at Mons and Ypres, being mentioned in despatches three times. He won the Distinguished Conduct Medal in 1915 and the Military Cross in 1916 while serving with the 3rd Battalion, Royal Fusiliers. He was commissioned in 1916 and retired in 1920 as a captain.

In the Second World War he joined the 7th Wiltshire (Salisbury) Battalion of the Home Guard as a lieutenant. Notice of his citation was published in the London Gazette of 27 November 1942.

Notes

Sources
 George Cross database: W G Foster

1880 births
1942 deaths
Royal Fusiliers officers
Royal Fusiliers soldiers
British Home Guard officers
British recipients of the George Cross
British Army personnel of the Second Boer War
British Army personnel of World War I
Recipients of the Military Cross
Recipients of the Distinguished Conduct Medal
British military personnel killed in World War II
Deaths by hand grenade
People born at sea